Silbaš is a village located in the Bačka Palanka municipality, South Bačka District, Vojvodina, Serbia. As of 2011 census, it has a population of 2,467 inhabitants.

Historical population

See also
 List of places in Serbia
 List of cities, towns and villages in Vojvodina

References
 Slobodan Ćurčić, Broj stanovnika Vojvodine, Novi Sad, 1996.

External links

Bačka Palanka
Places in Bačka
South Bačka District